KGAL (1580 AM, "NewsTalk 1580") is a U.S. radio station licensed to serve Lebanon, Oregon. The station, which began broadcasting in 1995, is owned by the Eads Broadcasting Corporation.

Programming
KGAL broadcasts a news/talk/sports radio format featuring a mix of local and syndicated programs including sports talk, conservative talk, local news, and live sporting events.

Talk shows
Local weekday programs include Morning Update with Weldon Greig and Jeff McMahon, Valley Talk hosted by Jeff McMahon and Hasso Hering.  Weekday syndicated programming includes Midnight Trucking Radio Network, Bill Bennett in the Morning with William Bennett, America in the Morning with Jim Bohannon, plus talk shows hosted by Dennis Prager, commentator and film critic Michael Medved, conservative author Hugh Hewitt, Radio Hall of Fame member Jim Bohannon, plus the Midnight Radio Network.

Sports
In addition to its regularly scheduled talk programming, KGAL airs Seattle Seahawks NFL Football, Lebanon High School varsity sporting events and University of Oregon Ducks football games.

A Moment in Oregon History
Throughout 2009, KGAL and sister station KSHO aired a series of one-minute historical vignettes as part of Oregon's sesquicentennial celebration. The program, titled A Moment in Oregon History, highlights notable Oregon residents and key historical events.  Each of the 240 vignettes was written by author Rick Steber.

History
The Eads Broadcasting Corporation received the original construction permit for this station from the U.S. Federal Communications Commission (FCC) on December 27, 1994.  The new station was assigned the call letters KGAL by the FCC on January 23, 1995.  KGAL received its license to cover from the FCC on November 20, 1995.

KGAL was one of two radio stations in 1997 broadcasting the games of the Portland Forest Dragons of the Arena Football League. That team would ultimately leave Portland after the 1999 season.

Awards and honors
Eads Broadcasting owner Charlie Eads was the Broadcaster of the Year in Oregon and was honored as Volunteer of the Year at the 2009 Ovation Awards given out at the annual Northwest Festivals and Events Conference.  Eads was cited for his work with the Willamette Valley Concert Band, the Linn County Cultural Coalition, and several other community organizations.

References

External links
KGAL official website

GAL
News and talk radio stations in the United States
Sports radio stations in the United States
Radio stations established in 1995
Lebanon, Oregon
1995 establishments in Oregon